Aimee van Wynsberghe is an AI ethicist at the University of Bonn in Bonn, Germany. She is also the president and co-founder of the Foundation for Responsible Robotics, a not-for-profit NGO that advocates for the ethical design and production of robots.

Education and career 
Originally from London, Ontario, she received her bachelor's degree in cell biology from the University of Western Ontario, after which she obtained dual master's degrees in applied ethics and bioethics from KU Leuven in Belgium and the European Union's Erasmus Mundus program. She received her PhD from the University of Twente in 2012; her dissertation involved the creation of an ethical framework for the use of care robots in the medical field and was nominated for the Georges Giralt Award for best PhD thesis in Robotics.

van Wynsberghe has been working in the field of robotics since 2004, beginning her career as a research assistant at CSTAR (Canadian Surgical Technologies and Advance Robotics). From 2014 to 2017 she was an assistant professor at the University of Twente, where her work focused on robot ethics, before serving as an associate professor in ethics and technology at Delft University of Technology. She was the first woman to be awarded an Alexander von Humboldt Professorship for Applied Ethics of Artificial Intelligence in 2020 and moved to Bonn, Germany to take on the directorship of Bonn University's Institute of Science and Ethics and set up a lab on Sustainable Artificial Intelligence.

In 2015, van Wynsberghe and Noel Sharkey established the Foundation for Responsible Robotics (FRR), a not-for-profit, non-governmental organization that advocates for the ethical design and production of robots. In founding the FRR, van Wynsberghe and Sharkey cited the urgent need for a greater level of accountability and attention to ethics in the design of robots, especially those that complete jobs through automation. She currently serves as the president of the foundation, organizing multi-stakeholder workshops; writing and disseminating consultation documents and reports; establishing public-private partnerships; and addressing legislative bodies within the European Union.

van Wynsberghe is also a member of multiple organizations focusing on the ethics of technology. She has been appointed to the European Commission's High-Level Expert Group on Artificial Intelligence (AI HLG) and currently serves on the board of numerous NGOs, including the Institute for Accountability in the Digital Age and the Netherlands Alliance for AI (ALLAI Netherlands). She also serves on the advisory board of the AI & Intelligent Automation Network.

Academic contributions 
According to Google Scholar, van Wynsberghe's work has been cited over 1200 times and currently holds an h-index of 17. She is the author of the 2016 book Healthcare Robots: Ethics, Design and Implementation, which addresses the current and future role of robots in the healthcare sector and the urgent need to impose ethical guidelines on their use.

Awards and honors 
Van Wynsberghe was a 2015 recipient of an NWO Veni Personal Research Grant to study the ethical design of care robots. In 2017, Van Wynsberghe appeared on Robohub's "25 Women in Robotics You Need to Know About" list. In July 2018 she was listed among the British Interactive Media Association's "100 Ai Influencers Worth Following". Van Wynsberghe was a 2018 recipient of the Dutch L’Oréal – UNESCO For Women in Science Fellowship. She was awarded an Alexander von Humboldt Professorship for Applied Ethics of Artificial Intelligence in 2020.

Media 
In January 2018, van Wynsberghe was interviewed for a Raddington Report article entitled “Robot Ethics, Robot Equality.” In June 2018 she was featured on BBC's Today program and was interviewed by Seth Adler at the Artificial Intelligence & Intelligent Automation Network. Van Wynsberghe has spoken at major international events including Web Summit, the European Investment Bank Global Investment Forum, AI for Good's Global Summit, and the Economist's Innovation Summit. Van Wynsberghe was interviewed for the 2017 VPRO documentary Robo Sapiens, which discusses humankind's future with robots.

References

External links 
 Official Website

Living people
Year of birth missing (living people)
Businesspeople from London, Ontario
Academic staff of the University of Bonn
Organization founders
Non-profit executives
University of Western Ontario alumni
Canadian expatriates in Germany
KU Leuven alumni
University of Twente alumni
Canadian ethicists
German ethicists
German philosophers
Canadian roboticists
Women roboticists
Philosophers of technology
Artificial intelligence ethicists